Graham Paul Shaw (born 7 June 1967) is an English former footballer who made nearly 300 appearances in the Football League playing for Stoke City, Preston North End, Plymouth Argyle and Rochdale between 1985 and 1996.

Playing career

Stoke City
Shaw was born in Newcastle-under-Lyme and signed on professional terms for local side Stoke City in June 1985 after progressing through the youth ranks at the Victoria Ground. He had a decent debut season for Stoke in 1985–86 scoring five goals in 22 appearances. He played in 20 matches in 1986–87 scoring twice and was top-scorer in 1987–88 with ten goals. During that season Stoke played Liverpool in the FA Cup and Shaw had the chance to win the match for Stoke after he was put through one on one with 'keeper Mike Hooper but Shaw hesitated thinking he was offside and the chance had gone. Stoke went on to lose the replay 1–0. Shaw scored six goals in 33 games in the 1988–89 season before being surprisingly sold by Mick Mills to Third Division Preston North End for £70,000.

Preston North End
Shaw's time at Deepdale was a mixed affair however with him brilliant one game and then extremely disappointing the next. Much of this can however be put down to injuries and the fact that he never really had a regular or good enough strike partner. His first season with the club though started like a house on fire with him scoring six goals in his first four games including a League cup hat-trick against Tranmere Rovers. The rest of the season was a disappointment though with Shaw picking up an injury a few games later against Bristol Rovers and adding only five more goals to his early season burst.

His next two seasons with the club were more consistent with Shaw missing only a few games and scoring 15 goals in 1990–91 and 17 in 1991–92. Surprisingly though Shaw was offered the chance to return to Stoke on the eve of the 1992–93 season. With North End boss Les Chapman given funds to strengthen his squad after 2 disappointing seasons in which the club only just avoided relegation Shaw was sold back to Stoke as part payment for bringing Tony Ellis back to Preston. In all Shaw played 136(8) games for Preston scoring 42 goals.

Return to Stoke City
Shaw's second spell at Stoke started well with Shaw scoring six goals in 38 appearances in 1992–93 helping Stoke win the Second Division title. However a persistent back injury limited his appearances and had a spell on loan at Plymouth Argyle at the beginning of the 1994–95 season also proved fruitless with Shaw failing to register a goal in six games.

Rochdale
In March 1995 though Rochdale signed Shaw on a free transfer. In little over a season, Shaw played 28 games for the club, scoring just two goals and was released in May 1996.

After football
Shaw considered coaching  but after much deliberation decided to go to Staffordshire University and study criminal law. With the help of the PFA's education fund passed his final exams to become a fully qualified criminal lawyer. After working for a firm in Stoke-on-Trent for five years he now practices in Newcastle-Under-Lyme as a commercial sports solicitor. In August 2010 prospective Port Vale investor Mike Newton revealed his plans to install Shaw as Chief Executive of the club.

Career statistics
Source:

A.  The "Other" column constitutes appearances and goals in the Anglo-Italian Cup, Football League Trophy, Full Members Cup.

Honours
 Stoke City
 Football League Second Division champions: 1992–93

References

External links
 SoccerBase Database

1967 births
Living people
English footballers
Stoke City F.C. players
Preston North End F.C. players
Rochdale A.F.C. players
Plymouth Argyle F.C. players
Leek Town F.C. players
Alumni of Staffordshire University
Sportspeople from Newcastle-under-Lyme
English lawyers
English Football League players
Association football forwards